The Feeble Files is an adventure video game about the adventures of an alien called Feeble. The game is a science fiction comedy, with a similar style of British humour to that of Adventure Soft's previous games, the Simon the Sorcerer series.

It was created and released in the UK in 1997 by Adventure Soft. e.p.i.c. interactive (now RuneSoft) created a Mac version in 2001 and an Amiga version in 2002 that were released in Europe. In 2002 the Mac version was released in the U.S..

The game was made available for DRM-free digital distribution from GOG.com on December 30, 2008.

Gameplay
For interaction the game uses a point-and-click navigation system synonymous with adventure games. The player is in control of the main character, Feeble, and must solve various puzzles to advance through the game and complete his quest. However, the player eventually gets the opportunity to use SAM, a robot with a penchant for genocide, to solve certain puzzles in the game. When using SAM the players cursor changes and different options are available to interact with objects in the environment, adding more depth to the gameplay.

At one point during the game the player must win several arcade games in order to advance, however these games use completely different gameplay methods and often proved to be very difficult for players. In the end Adventure Soft released a saved game just after the arcade section to allow people to carry on playing.

The story and puzzles within the game are all of a linear nature.

Plot
'The Feeble Files is loosely based on elements of the dystopian novel Nineteen Eighty-Four by George Orwell which describes a government and society similar to Feeble's and features a protagonist with similar ambitions as Feeble's.

Characters
Feeble: A young and able scientist at the Ministry of Galactic Uncertainty (Crop Circle Division) whose main task is to travel to far corners of the galaxy, such as Earth's solar system, in order to burn circles in crop fields (whose exact objective apart from scaring the locals, however, is never revealed). After another day at work, Feeble encounters an asteroid field on his way back and crashes into a space probe, which in turn crashes into his workplace, thus getting him in serious trouble and, consequently, into the Freedom Fighters.
Dolores: A freedom fighter who recruits Feeble into their ranks, helping him out of prison first. Tough, resourceful and persistent, she makes a model of a rebel. She is of the same species as Feeble, though is much taller than him (apart from his brother, their mother and their grandfather, there are no other Grenelons in the game). Dolores is a playable character in a short sequence of the game, the only one to employ a FPS kind of gameplay.
SAM: A 13-class intercepting robot, SAM is discovered by Dolores on board the prison vessel, shortly after their crash landing on the planet Filb. As a deadly dangerous and always willing to fight robot, SAM's relationship with the peaceful Feeble is, at first, rather shaky, though after a while they learn to get along quite well. SAM is the second playable character after Feeble.

Institutions
OmniBrain: The OmniBrain is the governing power of the galaxy, controlling and seeing everything via the all-powerful OmniCorporation and its tortuous bureaucracy, and the sinister Enforcers. The game states “he considers all life forms everywhere to be his citizens, and he loves them and cares for them in the way that is best for them, and wants them all to be happy. Praise be to the OmniBrain!" This fine line between a god and a dictatorship is explored at many points throughout the game. The OmniBrain is an obvious reference to Orwell's Big Brother.
OmniCorporation: Widely known as the Company, the OmniCorporation is the ruling body of Feeble's universe and its actual existence, unlike the OmniBrain's, is unquestionable. One of the Company's main objectives is to ensure that all citizens remain loyal and happy. The former is achevied by providing the citizens with various types of substances that lower one's abilities to think critically of the society they see around them. The latter is implemented by the so-called Happy Bots who patrol the city of Metro Prime, killing everybody that seems upset, even if the reason for their anxiety is by no means concerned with politics. The Company's counterpart in Orwell's novel is the Party.
Ministry of Galactic Uncertainty: Feeble works for the Ministry of Galactic Uncertainty (Crop Circle Division). It is his job to fly to undeveloped planets, such as Earth, and create crop circles in order to increase the indigenous population's paranoia and uncertainty about the universe.  This is to stimulate greater scientific investigation and technological development, until the planet is sufficiently advanced that it is ready to be absorbed by the OmniCorporation.
Freedom Fighters: A group of rebels whose main and, apparently, only objective is to bring down the Company and the OmniBrain. The rebels have spent years trying to track down the OmniBrain's exact location in order to destroy him. The Freedom Fighters try to maintain contact with the population (and, possibly, recruit new members) by spreading Traitor TV, a TV channel outside the Company's control. The group is made up mostly of partisans and the game hints that in the course of their anti-Company struggle they have not refrained from killing civilians. The Freedom Fighters' means of recruiting new members are very cautious: the potential candidate is watched closely by one of the partisans and if he or she proves able to think independently and might serve to the rebels' cause, contact is established. Afterward, his or her Oracle is uploaded with a rebel version of the Encyclopedia (which might be a reference to Goldstein's book in Nineteen Eighty-Four). In such a way Feeble was recruited by Dolores. The Freedom Fighters refer to one another as comrades and they might have been based on communist guerillas.
Cygnus Alpha: The Company's most prominent penitentiary colony on board which hundreds of citizens are gradually brainwashed and deprived of all independent thoughts and feelings but unswerving love for the OmniBrain. The Cygnus Alpha security system comprises a network of screens that display a hypnotyzing spiral from time to time so as to make sure that no prisoner has time to think clearly for a longer period. The inmates divide their time into sleeping, eating disgusting food, watching TV and working on an assembly line that construct Company propaganda devices.
Filb: A C-class planet outside the OmniCorporation, inhabited by a race of primitive blue aliens who worship as a god the only operative of the only Company outpost on the planet, Feeble's hated brother, Filbert, who uses them as test subjects for his experiments.
Directives: Directives are rules created by the OmniBrain to make the world better; there are over a million of them. As the game progresses a record is kept of all the rules that Feeble has broken.

Development
The game is presented in pre-rendered 2D graphics at a much higher resolution than the Simon the Sorcerer games series. However, given the five-year gap between its original UK release and the US release there have been several claims that it looks dated.

To bring Feeble's world to life several famous actors were recruited to provide the voices. Feeble was voiced by Robert Llewellyn from the BBC comedy Red Dwarf (after previously having co-star Chris Barrie as Simon the Sorcerer), and Blake's 7’s Peter Tuddenham provides the voice for the Oracle.

Reception

In 2011, Adventure Gamers named The Feeble Files the 91st-best adventure game ever released. The game was made compatible with ScummVM in version 0.9.1.

See alsoThe Space Bar''

References

External links

The Feeble Files at the Hall of Light

1997 video games
Adventure games
Amiga games
Classic Mac OS games
MorphOS games
Point-and-click adventure games
Science fiction video games
ScummVM-supported games
Video games about extraterrestrial life
Video games developed in the United Kingdom
Windows games
RuneSoft games
Single-player video games
Adventure Soft games